Haremde Dört Kadın is a 1965 Turkish drama film, directed by Halit Refiğ and starring Tanju Gürsu, Nilüfer Aydan, Cüneyt Arkın, and Pervin Par.

Plot

Cast 
 Cüneyt Arkın
 Nilüfer Aydan
 Pervin Par
 Tanju Gürsu

References

External links
 

1965 films
Turkish drama films
1965 drama films
1965 LGBT-related films
Films directed by Halit Refiğ
Turkish black-and-white films
Turkish LGBT-related films
Films set in the Ottoman Empire
1960s historical romance films